The Roman Catholic Diocese of Kotido is a diocese in the Ecclesiastical province of Tororo in Uganda.

History
 May 20, 1991: Established as Diocese of Kotido from the Diocese of Moroto

Leadership
 Bishops of Kotido (Roman rite)
 Bishop Denis Kiwanuka Lote (1991.05.20 – 2007.06.27), appointed Archbishop of Tororo
 Bishop Giuseppe Filippi (2009.12.21 – 2022.10.25)
 Bishop Dominic Eibu (Since 2022.10.25)

See also
Roman Catholicism in Uganda
Kotido

References

Sources
catholic-hierarchy

External links
 GCatholic.org
 Catholic Hierarchy

Kotido
Roman Catholic dioceses established in 1991
Kotido District
1991 establishments in Uganda
Roman Catholic Ecclesiastical Province of Tororo